Diggin' in dah Vaults is a compilation album by Black Moon. The album features seven remixes of tracks originally released on their debut Enta da Stage, and a few songs originally released as B-Sides on past singles. The track "Headz Ain't Redee" was originally featured on the Gold-certified soundtrack to New Jersey Drive. The album was not authorized by the group, Nervous Records (US) bootlegged it after Black Moon refused to submit a new album and went to court with the record label.

Track listing

Charts

Weekly charts

Singles-chart positions

References

Black Moon (group) albums
Albums produced by Da Beatminerz
1996 compilation albums